Dried lime, also known as: black lime; noomi basra (Iraq); limoo amani (Iran); and loomi (Oman), is a lime that has lost its water content, usually after having spent a majority of its drying time in the sun. They are used whole, sliced, or ground, as a spice in Middle Eastern dishes. Originating in Oman – hence the Iranian name limoo amani and Iraqi name noomi basra ("lemon from Basra") – dried limes are popular in cookery across the Middle East.

Uses
Dried limes are used to add a sour flavor to dishes, through a process known as souring. In Persian cuisine, they are used to flavor stews and soups. Across the Middle East, they are used cooked with fish, whereas in Iraq, they are added to almost all dishes and stuffing. They can also be used to make dried lime tea. Powdered dried lime is also used as an ingredient in Middle Eastern-style baharat (a spice mixture). It is a traditional ingredient in the cuisines of Saudi Arabia, Iraq, and other countries of the Persian Gulf.

Flavor
Dried limes are strongly flavored. They taste sour and citrusy like fresh limes, but have an added earthy and somewhat smoky taste and lack the sweetness of fresh limes. Because they are preserved, they also have a slightly bitter, fermented flavor, but the bitter accents are mainly concentrated in the lime's outer skin and seeds.

Tea
Dried lime tea is a type of herbal tea made from dried limes and is a popular beverage in Iraq where it is used to aid indigestion, diarrhea, and nausea.

See also
 List of dried foods

References

External links

Spice Pages: Lime
Black Lemons 

Arab cuisine
Dried fruit
Iranian cuisine
Iraqi cuisine
Spices
Limes (fruit)